Crazy in Love is the first studio album by South Korean girl group Itzy. It consists of sixteen tracks, including the lead single "Loco". It was released on September 24, 2021, by JYP Entertainment.

The album was commercially successful, peaking at number one on South Korea's Gaon Album Chart and at number 11 on the US Billboard 200, marking Itzy's second and highest-charting entry on the latter. Crazy in Love was certified 2× Platinum in February 2022 by the Korea Music Content Association for achieving 500,000 units sold.

Background and release
On August 13, 2021, JYP Entertainment announced that Itzy would be releasing their first studio album titled Crazy in Love on September 24. On August 31, the promotional schedule for their comeback was released. On September 6, the opening trailer was released. The following day, the group teaser photo for lead single "Loco" was released. On September 10, the track listing was released. On September 20, a highlight medley teaser video was released. On September 21, the music video teaser for album track "Swipe" was released. The following day, the music video teaser for lead single "Loco" was released.

Composition
Crazy in Love consists of sixteen songs. The lead single "Loco" was described as a song that "expresses the strong attraction that was first felt in the style of Generation Z". "Swipe" was described as a song that "sends a warning message to the person who crosses the line" with "808 drum beats, heavy bass, and melodic rap" that "flows over the retro clarinet". "Sooo Lucky" is a pop song with "funky guitar sound" and "cool bass". The song lyrics delivers the message of "a miracle that you and I fell in love among billions of people". "#Twenty" is a hip hop song that describing the "excitement and palpitation of having just turned 20". "Gas Me Up" was described as song with lyrics that "the anxiousness just before going on stage, but believing in yourself that you would do well and return". "Love Is" is a modern pop song with an "impressive message" that described "love grow a little more  complicated and difficult with emotional love". "Chillin' Chillin" was described as a song about "the excitement of going on a trip away from ordinary daily life". "Mirror" was described as a song that "maximized its charm" with "warm message of [I am already good enough as I am]" accompanied by member's emotional vocals.

Critical reception

Tanu I. Raj of NME found Crazy in Love "underwhelming" in comparison to Itzy's previous works. In a three-star review she said that the album is "conceptually and logically sound in ushering in an era of maturity for [Itzy], but we can’t help but think back about the act who first made us fall in love with them with their message of empowerment." Benson Ang of The Straits Times gave the album a four-star rating, praising "catchy" and "high-energy" songs and noting "the album makes for a great soundtrack for a girls' night out."

Accolades

Commercial performance
In South Korea, Crazy in Love debuted at number two on the Gaon Album Chart in the chart issue dated September 19–25, 2021. The album debuted at number four on the Gaon Monthly album chart with 335,610 copies sold, becoming Itzy's highest-selling album. By the end of 2021, the album surpassed 500,124 copies sold. In November 2021, Crazy in Love was certified Platinum by the Korea Music Content Association for selling over 250,000 copies.  In February 2022, it was certified 2× Platinum for selling over 500,000 copies. Crazy in Love reached its peak at number one on the Gaon Album Chart in the chart issue dated January 30-February 5, 2022.

In the United States, the album debuted at number 11 on the Billboard 200 and at number one on the Top Album Sales chart with 22,000 sales, of which CD sales comprised 21,000 and 1,000 were via digital download. This was the group's second and highest-charting entry on the Billboard 200 after Guess Who earlier in the year and marked their first leader on the Top Album Sales chart. The album debuted at number one on Billboards World Albums and Independent Albums charts in the same week as well.

In Japan, the album debuted at position 8 on the Oricon Albums Chart in the chart issue dated October 11, 2021. The album also debuted at position 34 on Billboard Japan Hot Albums in the chart issue dated September 29, 2021.

Promotion
Prior to the album's release, on September 24, 2021, Itzy held a live event called "ITZY #OUTNOW COMEBACK SHOW" on Naver Now to introduce the album and communicate with their fans.

Track listing

Credits and personnel
Credits adapted from Melon.

Studio

 JYPE Studios – recording, digital editing, mixing 
 GALACTIKA Studios – recording, digital editing 
 Vibe Music Studio 606 – digital editing 
 Canton House Studios – mixing 
 GLAB Studios – mixing 
 JoeLab – mixing 
 Sterling Sound – mastering 
 821 Sound Mastering – mastering 

Personnel

 Itzy – vocals, background vocals
 Star Wars (Galactika) – lyrics, composition, recording 
 Jo Yoon-kyung – lyrics 
 Shim Eun-ji – lyrics, composition, arrangement, vocal directing 
 Baek Geum-min (JamFactory) – lyrics 
 Jo In-ho (lalala studio) – lyrics 
 Vacation – lyrics 
 Choi Ji-yoon (153/Joombas) – lyrics 
 Yoon Ye-ji – lyrics 
 Earattack – lyrics, composition, arrangement, instruments 
 Sophia Pae – lyrics , background vocals , vocal directing 
 Athena (Galactika) – composition, synthesizer, keyboard, bass, digital editing 
 Woo Bin (Galactika) – composition, synthesizer, keyboard, bass 
 Ludwig Lindell – composition, arrangement, programming 
 Josefin Glenmark – composition, background vocals 
 Oneye – composition 
 Lee Min-young (EastWest) – composition, arrangement, vocal directing, programming, bass, drum 
 Yeul (1by1) – composition, arrangement, programming, piano, bass, drum 
 Charles "Chizzy" Stephens – composition, arrangement, instruments 
 Chan's – composition, arrangement, instruments 
 Eniac – composition 
 Patricia K – composition 
 Kim Bo-mi – composition 
 April Bender – composition 
 Team Galactika – arrangement 
 Ian Asher – composition, arrangement, programming, instruments 
 Anne Judith Stokke Wik – composition 
 Nermin Harambašić – composition 
 Ronny Svendsen – composition 
 250 – composition, arrangement, vocal directing, programming, instruments 
 Ylva Dimberg – composition 
 Harold Philippon – composition 
 Kim Yeon-seo – composition, background vocals, vocal directing 
 Young Chance – composition, vocal directing, digital editing 
 Shorelle – composition, vocal directing 
 David Anthony Eames – composition 
 Sebastian Thott – composition, arrangement, programming, instruments 
 Rosanna Enér – composition 
 Alawn – arrangement, programming, mixing, bass, synthesizer, drums 
 Bangkok – arrangement, programming, instruments 
 Ra.L – background vocals 
 Friday (Galactika) – background vocals, vocal directing 
 e.NA (Galactika) – background vocals 
 OGI (Galactika) – background vocals 
 Aiden – background vocals 
 Yi Da-eun – background vocals 
 Sound Kim – background vocals 
 Earattack – recording, vocal directing 
 Um Se-hee – recording, digital editing, 
 Park Eun-jung – recording 
 Yi Sang-yeop – recording 
 Gu Hye-jin – recording 
 Choi Hye-jin – recording 
 Jeong Yu-ra – digital editing 
 Jiyoung Shin NYC – digital editing 
 Jeong Mo-yeon – digital editing 
 Yue – digital editing 
 Kang Sun-young – digital editing 
 Jaycen Joshua – mixing 
 Jacob Richards – mixing (assistant) 
 Mike Seaberg – mixing (assistant) 
 DJ Riggins – mixing (assistant) 
 Im Hong-jin – mixing 
 Shin Bong-won – mixing 
 Lee Tae-seop – mixing 
 Park Eun-jung – mixing 
 MasterKey – mixing 
 Uncle Jo – mixing 
 Kang Dong-ho – mixing (assistant) 
 Chris Gehringer – mastering 
 Kwon Nam Woo – mastering 
 Chang (Galactika) – drums, synthesizer, keyboard, bass 
 Park Cella Kim – guitar 
 Jeong Su-wan – guitar

Charts

Weekly charts

Monthly charts

Year-end charts

Certifications

Release history

References

2021 debut albums
Korean-language albums
Itzy albums
JYP Entertainment albums